Odontotaenius floridanus is a beetle of the family Passalidae. It is endemic to Lake Wales Ridge in Florida.

Description

Odontotaenius floridanus adult individuals can range in size from 30 to 40 mm. These beetles have a glossy black body and present golden hair on their legs, antennae and pronotum. A series of 10 to 15 indentations can be seen on the upper abdomen (elytra), while the upper thorax is vertically divided into two equal segments by a deep groove. The antennae are composed of 10 segments, the 3 distal ones forming a structure defined as a "lamellated club". The single horn is situated between the eyes and points forward. The lifespan of adult Odontotaenius floridanus is up to a year. A distinctive feature of these type of beetles is that they produce a screeching noise when disturbed.

References

Passalidae
 Endemic fauna of the United States